Samuel White ( – 29 May 1854) was an Irish Whig politician.

He may also have served briefly in the army.

Between 1809 and 1810, he served as High Sheriff of Leitrim and then, upon the death of his father, he received an annuity of £7,000, and immediately declared to stand for election as MP for Leitrim at a by-election in 1824, stating his principles were similar to those of his father who had "loved Ireland and belonged to no party". He was elected unopposed, but then remained fairly silent in the Commons, emulating his brother, Henry, who generally sided with the Whigs. For example, he divided for an advance of capital to Ireland, for inquiries into the Irish church, and against the Irish insurrection bill and the new churches bill. During this time, he also served on the select committee on the state of Ireland.

As the next election dawned in 1826, he was criticised by pro-Catholic supporters for allying with his Tory colleague John Marcus Clements, and in response claimed to have followed his father's independent and liberal conduct. He was, nevertheless, returned again for the seat and began to serve as foreman of the Leitrim grand jury, a role he would reprise in 1830.

In parliament, he generally voted for Catholic relief, emancipation for both Catholics and Jews, and reform, and was then returned at elections to the seat for all elections through to 1847, when he retired.

References

External links
 

UK MPs 1820–1826
UK MPs 1826–1830
UK MPs 1830–1831
UK MPs 1831–1832
UK MPs 1832–1835
UK MPs 1835–1837
UK MPs 1837–1841
UK MPs 1841–1847
Whig (British political party) MPs for Irish constituencies
1854 deaths
High Sheriffs of Leitrim